Lahash (also Romanized as Lahāsh and Lehāsh; also known as Lāsh) is a village in Chelav Rural District, in the Central District of Amol County, Mazandaran Province, Iran. At the 2006 census, its population was 17, in 5 families.

References 

Populated places in Amol County